Nicrophorus sepulchralis is a burying beetle described by Oswald Heer in 1841. It is endemic to the mountains of southern Europe.

References

Silphidae
Beetles of Europe
Beetles described in 1841